Ismael Pérez Pazmiño (Machala, June 30, 1876 - Los Angeles, November 1, 1944) was founder of El Universo newspaper of Guayaquil, Ecuador, and former senator of El Oro province.

He was born in Machala in El Oro province. His parents were José Pérez Santander and Elena Pazmiño Gómez.

On September 16, 1921, he published the first edition of El Universo.

He was married to Herlinda Castro Santander de Pérez Pazmiño. His children were Ismael, Sucre, Francisco, Efraín, Franklin Pérez Castro, and his grandchildren are Carlos Pérez Perasso, Francisco Pérez Febres-Cordero.

El Universo is still run by Pérez Pazmiño's descendants.

Many educational institutions and streets bear his name in Ecuador.

He died  of cancer in Los Angeles, California on November 1, 1944.

References 

1876 births
1944 deaths
People from Machala
Ecuadorian journalists
Male journalists
Ecuadorian male writers
Ecuadorian politicians